Regulation may refer to:
 Government functions:
 Regulation of the polity, economy and society
 Regulatory economics

 Regulation (European Union), Union legislation effective in member states without implementing legislation by them
 Regulation, secondary or delegated legislation, by the executive branch pursuant to leave of the legislative branch
 Regulations, class of statutory instruments
 Regulation (magazine), Cato Institute publication re moderation of government regulation 
 The length of a competition in sports which is prescribed by the rules of said sport. Time beyond regulation is used in some sports or situations within sports to break ties, and is known as overtime.
 Regulation of gene expression, the biological process where genes are selectively expressed
 Control in electrical subsystems:
 Voltage regulation, degree to which a device's output voltage remains nominal
 Categories of voltage control:

 Line regulation, compensation for variations in supplied voltage

 Load regulation, compensation for variations in demand

See also
 
 
 Regulate (disambiguation)
 Regulator (disambiguation)